Lemay is a census-designated place (CDP) in south St. Louis County, Missouri, United States. The population was 16,645 at the 2010 census.

History
Lemay was named after Francois Lemai, who operated a ferry boat across the Meramec River in the early nineteenth century.

Geography
Lemay is located at  (38.532552, -90.285332).

Demographics

At the 2000 census there were 17,215 people, 7,186 households, and 4,390 families living in the CDP. The racial makeup of the CDP was 98.51% White, 0.02% African American, 0.007% Native American, 0.53% Asian, 0.01% Pacific Islander, 0.66% from other races, and 0.96% from two or more races. Hispanic or Latino of any race were 1.03%.
Of the 7,186 households 26.5% had children under the age of 18 living with them, 43.6% were married couples living together, 12.6% had a female householder with no husband present, and 38.9% were non-families. 34.3% of households were one person and 16.8% were one person aged 65 or older.  The average household size is 2.33 and the average family size was 2.99.

The age distribution was 22.8% under the age of 18, 7.7% from 18 to 24, 27.9% from 25 to 44, 21.4% from 45 to 64, and 20.1% 65 or older.  The median age was 39 years.  For every 100 females, there were 89.8 males.  For every 100 females age 18 and over, there were 84.0 males.

The median household income was $34,559 and the median family income  was $41,128. Males had a median income of $31,886 versus $25,388 for females. The per capita income for the CDP was $18,730.  About 7.1% of families and 10.4% of the population were below the poverty line, including 13.2% of those under the age of 18 and 11.3% of those ages 65 and older.

Economy
The River City Casino is located in Lemay.

Schools
Hancock is the primary school district in Lemay. Hancock enrolls approximately 1600 students. Hancock High School is located at 229 West Ripa Ave. Hancock Middle School is located at 243 West Ripa Ave. Hancock Elementary School  is located at 9101 South Broadway Ave. Hancock Early Childhood Center is located at 9417 South Broadway Ave.

References

External links
 Lemay, Missouri (City-Data.com)
 Lemay Chamber of Commerce

Census-designated places in St. Louis County, Missouri
Census-designated places in Missouri